"Like I Do" is a song by American singer Christina Aguilera from her eighth studio album Liberation. American rapper GoldLink is featured on the song. The track was released as the third single on June 7, 2018. A lyric video for the song was later released on YouTube on June 21, 2018. The single received a Grammy Award nomination for Best Rap/Sung Performance at the 61st Annual Grammy Awards, held in 2019.

Critical reception
David Smyth of the Evening Standard called the song the "slickest, most appealing production" of its parent album. Jennifer Drysdale (Entertainment Tonight) singled the track out as a "flirty" number while also showcasing "more of a pop sound" for the then upcoming Liberation album. USA Today critic Patrick Ryan also defined the song as a "flirty" track "whose hypnotic high flutes and dexterous guest verse from rapper GoldLink will be lodged in your brain all summer".

Writing for HotNewHipHop, Chantilly Post noted that "Like I Do" sounds "like home for GoldLink as if the song could have been on his previous album At What Cost" while giving the song a "hot" stamp. According to Masani Musa of The Source, the track is noticeable for highlighting Aguilera's "smooth and subtle vocals", while also showcasing the vocalist's "unapologetically belting over an airy flute melody that is seeped in nostalgia". She also refers to the collaboration as "everything we needed". Similarly, Sajae Elder, of Complex, noted the "great opening verse" and claimed the song's "syncopated, summery production [...] gives a sexy nod to love songs on the past". The "sexy" approach was also highlighted by Paris Close, writing for PopCrush, who noted that "no one does sexy like Xtina" adding that "when it comes to performance, she can show you better than she can tell you", while praising the "straight to the point" lyrics at the same time the "flute-tipped instrumentals play in the distance".

Idolator's Mike Nied defined the song as a "vibey mid-tempo", noting that "accenting the performance with vocal flourishes, it is a refreshing release that highlights Xtina's state of mind in 2018". Rolling Stone contributor Brittany Spanos highlighted GoldLink's references to Aguilera's earlier songs ("Genie in a Bottle", "Ain't No Other Man"), while considering the song a "self-assured track". Vrinda Jagota of Paper noted Anderson .Paak's production, especially the "whimsical wind instruments and synths", while also praising GoldLink's "slick contribution". Overall, "the song ambles on joyously for almost five minutes, a skittering drum beat and that boisterous flute line flitting throughout", according to the music critic. Pitchfork contributor Claire Lobenfeld chose "Like I Do" as "one spot where contemporary pop fare suits Aguilera" on the Liberation album. The BuzzFeed editor Dylan Nguyen labelled the song as "a modern R&B masterpiece".

On the other hand, The Guardians Alexis Petridis criticized the track. According to the music critic, "the most interesting thing about Like I Do is how its hook echoes Maroon 5’s 'Moves like Jagger', the biggest hit Aguilera’s been involved with in years". Similarly, Stereogum contributor Chris DeVille called the track a "squelchy, bouncy MILF encounter", while also referring to "Sick of Sittin'" as the "superior option" among the Anderson .Paak productions.

The Tab's Harrison Brocklehurst ranked "Like I Do" among the greatest Christina Aguilera singles of all time.

Charts

Release history

References

External links
 

Christina Aguilera songs
2018 songs
2018 singles
American hip hop songs
RCA Records singles
Songs written by Christina Aguilera
Songs written by Tayla Parx
Songs written by Anderson .Paak